Dauria, literally "Land of Daurs", may have the following meanings:

 Transbaikal, an area of Russia
 The lands of the Daurs more generally, including areas of Inner Mongolia in China
 Dauria, an airline
 Dauria, a 1971 film from the Soviet Union
 Dauria, a novel by Konstantin Sedykh